The Krim-class ocean liners consisted of six ships built during the late 1920s for service in the Black Sea. The first two ships were built in Germany, but the rest were built in the Soviet Union. Four ships were sunk during the Second World War, but the others survived the war.

Background
In 1928 the Sovtorgflot (Soviet Commercial Fleet) ordered two ships from the Friedrich Krupp Germaniawerft shipyard in Kiel, Germany and procured a license to build four more at the Baltic Works in Leningrad. The latter ships were virtually identical with their half-sisters, but differed slightly in some respects. The Krim-class ships were intended for service in the Black Sea with the Black Sea State Shipping Company.

Description 
Krim and Gruziya had a pair of six-cylinder, two-stroke diesel engines, each driving a screw propeller, and the engines were rated at a total of 1,163 nominal horsepower. The ship had a designed capacity of 450 passengers.

Ships

Service 
After completion they was assigned to the Black Sea State Shipping Company with their port of registry at Odessa.

References

Bibliography

 

Krim-class ocean liner
Ocean liner classes
Passenger ships of the Soviet Union
World War II passenger ships of the Soviet Union